The 2012–13 División de Honor Juvenil de Fútbol season is the 27th since its establishment. The regular season began on September 1, 2012, and ended on April 20, 2013. The Copa de Campeones begins in the week of May 5, 2013 and the Copa del Rey the week of May 19.

Regular season

Group 1

Group 2

Group 3

Group 4

Group 5

Group 6

Group 7

Copa de Campeones

Bracket

Group A

1st round

2nd round

Group B

1st round

2nd round

Final

Details

See also
2013 Copa del Rey Juvenil

External links
Group 1 at futbolme.com
Group 2 at futbolme.com
Group 3 at futbolme.com
Group 4 at futbolme.com
Group 5 at futbolme.com
Group 6 at futbolme.com
Group 7 at futbolme.com

2012–13
Juvenil